smag or variant, may refer to:

 Soviet Military Administration in Germany (1945-1949), Soviet occupation government in Germany post-WWII
 St. Mary's Academy, Guagua (SMAG), Pampanga, Philippines (est.1908), a co-ed Catholic school
 salaire minimum agricole garanti
 Salzgitter Maschinenbau AG, a German firm in Salzgitter-Bad
 Schiff- und Maschinenbau-Actien-Gesellschaft Germania, former name of German shipbuilder Friedrich Krupp Germaniawerft
 Sefer Mitzvot Gadol (SMaG) by Rabbi Moses ben Jacob of Coucy, enumerating the 613 commandments

See also
 SMAGS (Surface Movement and Guidance System)